Othello is a 1955 Soviet drama film directed by Sergei Yutkevich, based on the play Othello by William Shakespeare. It was entered into the 1956 Cannes Film Festival, where Yutkevich received the Best Director Award.

Cast
 Sergei Bondarchuk (in makeup) as Othello
Andrei Popov as Iago
 Irina Skobtseva as Desdemona
 Vladimir Soshalsky as Cassio
 Yevgeny Vesnik as Roderigo
 Antonina Maksimova as Emilia
 Yevgeny Teterin as Brabantio
 Mikhail Troyanovsky as Duke of Venice
 Aleksei Kelberer as Montano
 Nikolai Briling as Lodovico
 Leila Ashrafova as Bianca

References

Further reading
 .

External links

1955 films
1955 drama films
Soviet drama films
1950s Russian-language films
Films directed by Sergei Yutkevich
Films based on Othello
Blackface minstrel shows and films
Films scored by Aram Khachaturian
Films set in the 16th century
Films set in Venice
Films set in Cyprus